Isar-Damu (reigned c. 2320 BC), was the king (Malikum) of the first Eblaite kingdom. Isar-Damu fought a long war with Mari which ended in Eblaite victory; he was probably the last king of the first kingdom.

Reign
Isar-Damu succeeded his father Irkab-Damu as a young child; his mother, Dusigu, seems to have taken advantage of her position as her husband favorite consort and her probable familial relation to the powerful vizier Ibrium in order to elevate her son to the throne, despite him being one of Irkab-Damu youngest sons.

The first years of Isar-Damus's reign were dominated by his mother and the vizier; texts from Ebla show that Isar-Damu's name appeared on official documents  after that of his mother. Ibrium was the commander of the army and he conducted multiple campaigns against rebellious vassal-rulers or neighboring kingdoms.

Isar-Damu concluded an alliance with Nagar and the relations progressed toward a dynastic marriage between princess Tagrish-Damu, Isar-Damu's daughter, and prince Ultum-Huhu, Nagar's monarch's son. In year seven of Ibrium's term, Nagar was defeated by Mari, causing the blockage of trade routes between Ebla and southern Mesopotamia via upper Mesopotamia.

Ibrium became vizier two years prior to Isar-Damu reign and kept his office for 20 years dying in Isar-Damu's 18th regnal year; three years later, queen mother Dusigu died. Following Ibrium's death, an Eblaite campaign was sent against Alalakh. Isar-Damu concluded an alliance with Nagar and Kish against Mari, and the campaign was headed by the Eblaite vizier Ibbi-Sipish, Ibrium's son, who led the combined armies to victory in a battle near Terqa. Afterwards, the alliance attacked the rebellious Eblaite vassal city of Armi.

Succession
Isar-Damu ruled 35 years, and his main wife was Tabur-Damu but his crown prince Ir'ak-Damu was his son by an earlier consort whose name is unknown. Although Isar-Damu is generally considered Ebla's first kingdom last monarch, his son Ir'ak-Damu, who was married to Za'ase, Ibbi-Sipish's daughter, might have succeeded him for a short period.

See also

Ebla tablets
Cities of the ancient Near East
Eblaite-Mariote war

References

Citations

24th-century BC rulers
Kings of Ebla
24th-century BC people